Bunner is a surname. Notable people with the surname include:

Andrew F. Bunner (1841–1897), American painter and draughtsman
Angel Bunner (born 1989), American softball pitcher
Henry Cuyler Bunner (1855–1896), American novelist and poet
Rudolph Bunner (1779–1837), American politician

See also
Buner District